Qatar Islamic Bank (المصرف Q.P.S.C) was established in 1982 as the first Islamic financial institution in Qatar. Its products and operations are supervised by a Shari’a board, which ensures that the Bank adheres to Islamic banking and finance principles. It is the country's largest Shari’a-compliant lender.

As of 2019, QIB was the largest Islamic Bank in Qatar, with a 43% share of the Islamic sector and an 11% share of the banking market overall. It has over 170,000 retail clients and more than 3,000 corporate clients. It conducts its domestic business through 31 branches spread throughout the country, in addition to private centers for ladies and dedicated lounges for affluent customers, augmented by more than 175 multi-function ATM installations.

History and acquisitions
In 1982, QIB was established with a paid-up capital of QR 25mn. It opened its first branch for customers in July 1983.

In 1989, Al Jazeera finance was established, 30% owned by QIB. By 1996, QIB’s paid-up capital increased to QR 200mn and in 1998 it was listed on the Qatar Stock Exchange. 2000 saw the establishment of Aqar, 49% owned by QIB. Arab Finance House, 37% owned by QIB, was established in Beirut in 2003. By 2005, the number of QIB’s branches stood at 8; and its paid-up capital was increased to QR 663m.

2005 also saw the establishment of Asian Finance Bank (41.67% owned by QIB); and the following year QIB’s paid up capital increased to QR 1.19bn.

QInvest was established in 2007 (50.13% owned by QIB), QIB-UK was set up in 2008 (wholly owned subsidiary); and in 2009, BEEMA was established, with 25% owned by QIB.

In February 2018 QIB sold its 60% full stake in the Asian Finance Bank (AFB) to Malaysian Building Society Bhd (MBSB).

In March 2019, QIB successfully priced a US$ 750mn 5-year Sukuk at par with a profit rate of 3.982% (equivalent to a credit spread of 150bps over US$ Mid-Swaps). The Sukuk was met with strong investor demand as evidenced by the large orderbook which closed at US$3.1bn, representing an oversubscription rate of 4.1 times. In terms of geography, 46% of the Sukuk was allocated to Asian investors, followed by Middle Eastern accounts (23%), Europe (21%) and US/Other (10%). In total, non-Middle Eastern investors were allocated 77% of the Sukuk, which is a remarkable outcome and one of the highest international allocations achieved by any bank from the region. 60% of the investors were fund managers, 26% were banks & private banks and 14% were insurance companies & agencies. More than 140 investors from 28 countries spanning Europe, Asia, USA and the Middle East participated in the Sukuk.

In 2019, the Bank achieved a net profit of QAR 3,055.4 Million, representing a growth of 10.9% for the same period in 2018. Total assets of the Bank have increased by 6.7% compared to December 2018, and now stand at QAR 163.5 Billion. Financing activities have reached QAR 113.8 Billion and have grown by 11.3% compared to December 2018. Customer Deposits of the Bank now stand at QAR 111.6 Billion registering a strong growth by 11% compared to December 2018. Total Income for the year ended 31 December 2019 amounted to QAR 7,738.2 Million, registering 12.4% growth compared to 2018, reflecting a healthy growth in the Bank’s core operating activities.

In November 2019, Fitch Ratings affirmed Qatar Islamic Bank at 'A' with a Stable outlook. Also, in December 2019, Moody's Investors Service, ("Moody's") has affirmed the Long-term deposit ratings of QIB at “A1” with a Stable outlook. In May 2019, Capital Intelligence Ratings (CI) has affirmed the bank’s Long-term Currency Rating (LTCR) of ‘A+’ with a Stable outlook. In March 2019, Standard & Poor’s (S&P) affirmed the bank’s credit rating at ‘A-’ with a Stable outlook.

Major share holders
The Qatar Investment Authority (QIA) is the single largest shareholder of QIB. The balance of QIB’s shareholders comprise other Qatari individuals, families and institutions; and QIB’s shares are listed on the Qatar Exchange.

Board of directors
QIB is overseen by the following directors:
 Sheikh Jassim bin Hamad bin Jassim bin Jaber Al Thani (Chairman)
 Mr. Abdullatif Bin Abdulla Al Mahmoud (Vice-Chairman)
 Mr. Mohamed Bin Issa Al Mohanadi
 Mr. Abdulla Bin Saeed Al Eidah
 Mr. Nasser Rashid S. Al-Kaabi
 Mr. Mansour Al Muslah
 Sheikh Ali Bin Ghanim Bin Ali Al Thani
 Sheikh Abdulla Bin Khaled Bin Thani Al Thani
 Mr. Abdul Rahman Abdulla Abdul Ghani

References

Banks established in 1982
Banks of Qatar
Islamic banks
Companies based in Doha
Qatari companies established in 1982
Companies listed on the Qatar Stock Exchange